The 2000–01 European Challenge Cup was the fifth year of the European Challenge Cup, the second tier rugby union cup competition below the Heineken Cup. The tournament was held between October 2000 and May 2001.

Pool stage

Pool 1

Pool 2

Pool 3

Pool 4

Pool 5

Pool 6

Pool 7

Pool 8

Knockout stage

Quarter-finals

Semi-finals

Final

Harlequins: J. Williams, Gollings, Greenwood, Greenstock, O'Leary, Burke, M. Powell, Leonard, Wood, Dawson, Morgan, White-Cooper, Sanderson, Wilson, Winters.

Replacements: Friday, Chalmers, Jennings, Starr, Fuga, Codling, Jenkins.

Narbonne: Corletto, Joubert, Douy, A. Stoica, Rouch, Quesada, Sudre, Martinez, Ledesma, Pucciarello, Gaston, Merle, Furet, Raynaud, Reid.

Replacements: Racine, Poux, Plateret, Mathieu, Azema, Rosalen, Buada.

Referee: Nigel Whitehouse (Wales)

See also

European Challenge Cup
2000-01 Heineken Cup

 
2000–01 rugby union tournaments for clubs
2000-01
2000–01 in European rugby union
2000–01 in English rugby union
2000–01 in French rugby union
2000–01 in Irish rugby union
2000–01 in Italian rugby union
2000–01 in Welsh rugby union